Jack Keller may refer to:

Jack Keller (athlete) (1911–1978), American Olympic hurdler
Jack Keller (artist) (1922–2003), Marvel Comics artist
Jack Keller (poker player) (1942–2003), American poker player
Jack Keller (songwriter) (1936–2005), American composer, songwriter and record producer

See also
John Keller (1928–2000), basketball player
Johnny Keller, murder victim